Anthousai ( from ἄνθος ánthos, meaning "flower, blossom") are nymphs of flowers in Greek mythology. They were described as having hair that resembled hyacinth flowers.

References

Nymphs